Alisha Joy Bates (born 18 March 2002) is an Australian cricketer who plays as a slow left-arm orthodox bowler for the ACT Meteors in the Women's National Cricket League (WNCL).

Domestic career
Bates was signed by the Sydney Sixers for the 2019–20 Women's Big Bash League season, but did not play a match. In February 2022, she was called-up to the ACT Meteors squad for the restart of the 2021–22 Women's National Cricket League season.

On 22 February 2022 Bates made her debut for the ACT, against New South Wales, but the match was abandoned after 1.5 overs. Overall, she played five matches for the side that season, taking four wickets including a best bowling of 2/24, taken against Queensland. She played nine matches for the side in the 2022–23 Women's National Cricket League season, taking six wickets.

References

External links

Alisha Bates at Cricket Australia

2002 births
Living people
People from Gosford
Australian women cricketers
Sydney Sixers (WBBL) cricketers
ACT Meteors cricketers